Antena Sarajevo is a Bosnian commercial radio station, broadcasting from Sarajevo.

History and programming
RSG1 Sarajevo radio was founded 6 April 2009 and was conceived as an urban radio service for Sarajevo.
Since December 2012, a new Radio format is presented as a result of the positive experiences of RSG1 Sarajevo, and European and regional trends in the radio industry.

Antena Sarajevo is formatted as a city radio service that broadcasts only the greatest hits. Antenna Sarajevo is part of the informal media group in the radio market of Bosnia and Herzegovina called RSG Group.

The station focuses on contemporary pop music. Antenna Sarajevo also has traffic service for the city of Sarajevo, where listeners can find more information by calling the toll-free call center (0800 51 011). Latest national news broadcast for five minutes before the full hour, while the Sarajevo city news are broadcast every half-hour. Media servis produces all the news for Antenna Sarajevo.

The program is currently broadcast at one frequency (Sarajevo ), estimated number of potential listeners is around 426,581.

Frequencies

 Sarajevo

See also 
List of radio stations in Bosnia and Herzegovina

References

External links 
 
 Communications Regulatory Agency of Bosnia and Herzegovina
 Antena Sarajevo in Facebook
 Antena Sarajevo in Twitter

Sarajevo
Radio stations established in 2009
Mass media in Sarajevo